Purdue University Fort Wayne (PFW) is a public university in Fort Wayne, Indiana, United States. A campus of Purdue University, Purdue Fort Wayne was founded on July 1, 2018, when its predecessor university, Indiana University–Purdue University Fort Wayne formally split into two separate institutions: Purdue University Fort Wayne and Indiana University Fort Wayne. About two weeks before the split took effect, the athletic program, inherited solely by Purdue Fort Wayne, changed its branding from Fort Wayne Mastodons to Purdue Fort Wayne Mastodons. Most of the university's 14 men's and women's athletic teams compete in Division I of the NCAA Horizon League.

History 

In 1941, Purdue University permanently established the Purdue University Center in downtown Fort Wayne to provide a site for students to begin their undergraduate studies prior to transferring to the West Lafayette main campus to complete their degree. Twenty-four years earlier, Indiana University also began offering courses in Fort Wayne. From 1958–1964, both universities began the process of combining the two extension centers into one joint university, known as Indiana University – Purdue University Fort Wayne (IPFW).

IPFW opened on September 17, 1964, following nearly two years of construction on a  site northeast of downtown Fort Wayne. It awarded its first four-year degree in 1968. Eight years later, in 1976, IPFW absorbed the Fort Wayne Art Institute, an art school that had served the Fort Wayne community since 1897. In 1998, this academic unit was renamed the School of Fine and Performing Arts, later becoming the College of Visual and Performing Arts.

After several years of talks between IPFW, Purdue, and IU, IPFW was divided into two universities on July 1, 2018: Purdue University Fort Wayne, and Indiana University Fort Wayne. The division moved all departments involved in health care to Indiana University Fort Wayne, and all others into Purdue University Fort Wayne. The Philosophy and Geosciences departments, along with academic programs in French and German, were closed on January 1, 2017.

Campus

The Main Academic Campus, bounded by East Coliseum Boulevard (Indiana State Road 930) to the south, Crescent Avenue to the east, St. Joseph River to the west, and Canterbury Green Apartment complex and golf course to the north, includes the majority of academic and administrative buildings and parking.

The Waterfield Student Housing Campus, bounded by Crescent Avenue to the west, East Coliseum Boulevard and Trier Road to the south, and Hobson Road to the East, contains all of the privately owned residence halls. The main academic campus and Waterfield campus are connected via the Crescent Avenue Pedestrian Bridge, elevated above Crescent Avenue.

The Research-Incubator Campus, bounded by St. Joe Road to the west, Stellhorn Road to the south, Dean Drive to the north, and Sirlin Drive to the east includes the Northeast Indiana Innovation Center, a business incubator for entrepreneurs. This area of the campus was acquired in 2007 after the Fort Wayne State Developmental Center's closure, with the land donated between IPFW and Ivy Tech Community College of Indiana.

The former McKay Family Farm, located on the western bank of the St. Joseph River, is bounded by East Coliseum Boulevard to the south, St. Joseph River to the east, and development to the north and west. The Plex indoor soccer facility, Hefner Soccer Complex, Holiday Inn hotel, and Steel Dynamics Keith E. Busse Alumni Center are located on this portion of the campus, connected to the main academic campus via the pedestrian-only Ron Venderly Family Bridge. The Holiday Inn operates on property leased from the Indiana–Purdue Foundation, and is affiliated with Purdue Fort Wayne's Hospitality Management Program.

Architecture
Campus buildings generally feature brick in various shades of brown or tan, a nod to the brick façades of Purdue University's West Lafayette campus buildings. The grounds at Purdue Fort Wayne are manicured and landscaped as a multiple-hundred-acre park due in part to the generosity of Virginia Ayers, an avid long-time exerciser on campus who willed her estate to IPFW upon her death in 1986 (IPFW University Archives).

Administration
Purdue Fort Wayne is governed by the Purdue University Board of Trustees and the Purdue Fort Wayne Faculty Senate. The Indiana–Purdue Foundation owns most of the land that constitutes Purdue Fort Wayne and has entered into a 99-year lease with Allen County for additional land for $1.

Academics
Purdue University Fort Wayne is accredited by the Higher Learning Commission and offers more than 200 academic options.

Colleges, divisions, and schools
 College of Liberal Arts
 College of Science
 College of Engineering, Technology, and Computer Science
 College of Arts & Design
 Richard T. Doermer School of Business and Management Sciences
 Division of Continuing Studies

Prior to July 1, 2021, the College of Liberal Arts and the College of Science were combined in the College of Arts and Sciences. On the same date, the College of Professional Studies ceased operations.

Library system
Ground was broken in 2009 for a new US$42.4 million Student Services Complex, extending the second floor Learning Commons through a -long glass-enclosed elevated walkway, connecting Helmke Library to Walb Student Union and Hilliard Gates Sports Center. In November 2011, the Student Services Complex and Learning Commons were opened for use. The Learning Commons includes librarian research consulting, the Writing Center, IT services computing, and areas for group and individual study.

Athletics

Purdue Fort Wayne student athletes, known as the Purdue Fort Wayne Mastodons, compete as a National Collegiate Athletic Association Division I school in the Horizon League, and in the Midwestern Intercollegiate Volleyball Association for men's volleyball. The university participates in 16 men's and women's sports.

References

External links

 
 Purdue Fort Wayne Athletics website

 
Fort Wayne
Education in Fort Wayne, Indiana
Buildings and structures in Fort Wayne, Indiana
Tourist attractions in Fort Wayne, Indiana
2018 establishments in Indiana
Educational institutions established in 2018